Denis Grey Wigan (21 June 1893 – 31 December 1958) was an English first-class cricketer and British Army officer.

The son of Sir Frederick William Wigan, he was born at Walton-on-Thames in June 1893. He was educated at Eton College, where he took part in the Fowler's match of 1910 and captained the college cricket team in 1912. From Eton, Wigan went up to Magdalen College, Oxford. While studying at Oxford, he played first-class cricket for Oxford University in 1913 and 1914, making six appearances. He scored 119 runs in his six matches, at an average of 14.87 and a high score of 73 not out. Due to the commencement of the First World War in July 1914, his time at Oxford was prematurely cut short, denying him his blue.

Wigan served in the war, being commissioned as a second lieutenant in the King's Royal Rifle Corps in September 1914. He was promoted to lieutenant in December 1914. He was later made a temporary captain, but relinquished the rank in June 1915, having been repatriated to England suffering from neurasthenia, for which he was not successfully treated. During his absence from the front he was promoted to the full rank of captain in August 1916. His ill health led to him being invalided out of the army, with Wigan retiring from active service in June 1917. Following the war, he settled in Suffolk where he took up farming. Despite being invalided, he commanded his local Home Guard unit during the Second World War, though these duties too took a further strain on his health. Later in life he served as a justice of the peace for Suffolk. Wigan died in December 1958 at Pettistree, Suffolk. He was survived by his wife, Mabel, whom he had married in October 1915. The couple had four children, with two dying in infancy. His nephew, Charles Lyttelton, and brother-in-law, Geoffrey Colman, both played first-class cricket.

References

External links

1893 births
1958 deaths
People from Walton-on-Thames
People educated at Eton College
Alumni of Magdalen College, Oxford
English cricketers
Oxford University cricketers
King's Royal Rifle Corps officers
British Army personnel of World War I
People with post-traumatic stress disorder
English farmers
English justices of the peace
Younger sons of baronets